Upper Pittsgrove Township is a township in Salem County, New Jersey, United States.  As of the 2010 United States Census, the township's population was 3,505, reflecting an increase of 37 (+1.1%) from the 3,468 counted in the 2000 Census, which had in turn increased by 328 (+10.4%) from the 3,140 counted in the 1990 Census.

Upper Pittsgrove Township was incorporated on March 10, 1846, from portions of Pittsgrove Township. Portions of the township were taken on January 28, 1893, to form Elmer.

The township was named for Pittsgrove Township, which in turn was named for William Pitt, 1st Earl of Chatham, a supporter of the colonial cause.

It is a dry town, where alcohol cannot be sold, as affirmed by a referendum passed in 1979, though alcohol is available at a winery and a distillery in the township.

Geography
According to the United States Census Bureau, the township had a total area of 40.39 square miles (104.60 km2), including 40.24 square miles (104.23 km2) of land and 0.15 square miles (0.38 km2) of water (0.36%). Upper Pittsgrove leads New Jersey in acres of active agriculture and preserved farmland. The Salem River has its source in the township.

Unincorporated communities, localities and place names located partially or completely within the township include Ballingers Mill, Daretown, Foxs Mill, Friendship Church, Monroeville, New Freedom, Newkirk, Pittsgrove, Pole Tavern, Shirley, Whig Lane and Woods Mills.

The township borders Alloway Township, Elmer, Pilesgrove Township and Pittsgrove Township in Salem County; Upper Deerfield Township in Cumberland County; and Elk Township, Franklin Township and South Harrison Township in Gloucester County.

Demographics

Census 2010

The Census Bureau's 2006–2010 American Community Survey showed that (in 2010 inflation-adjusted dollars) median household income was $80,957 (with a margin of error of +/− $12,476) and the median family income was $83,438 (+/− $13,632). Males had a median income of $55,246 (+/− $4,750) versus $36,316 (+/− $13,317) for females. The per capita income for the borough was $30,264 (+/− $3,595). About 2.4% of families and 5.0% of the population were below the poverty line, including 2.2% of those under age 18 and 4.2% of those age 65 or over.

Census 2000
As of the 2000 United States Census there were 3,468 people, 1,207 households, and 959 families residing in the township. The racial makeup of the township was 94.84% White, 2.16% African American, 0.52% Native American, 0.32% Asian, 1.30% from other races, and 0.87% from two or more races. Hispanic or Latino of any race were 3.14% of the population.

There were 1,207 households, out of which 35.1% had children under the age of 18 living with them, 67.5% were married couples living together, 7.2% had a female householder with no husband present, and 20.5% were non-families. 16.9% of all households were made up of individuals, and 7.5% had someone living alone who was 65 years of age or older.  The average household size was 2.80 and the average family size was 3.13.

In the township the population was spread out, with 25.3% under the age of 18, 7.6% from 18 to 24, 27.5% from 25 to 44, 26.0% from 45 to 64, and 13.8% who were 65 years of age or older.  The median age was 39 years. For every 100 females, there were 99.3 males.  For every 100 females age 18 and over, there were 95.4 males.

The median income for a household in the township was $53,813, and the median income for a family was $56,768. Males had a median income of $41,319 versus $27,976 for females. The per capita income for the township was $21,732.  About 6.0% of families and 8.5% of the population were below the poverty line, including 12.7% of those under age 18 and 5.6% of those age 65 or over.

Government

Local government
Upper Pittsgrove Township is governed under the Township form of New Jersey municipal government, one of 141 municipalities (of the 564) statewide that use this form, the second-most commonly used form of government in the state. The Township Committee is comprised of five members, who are elected directly by the voters at-large in partisan elections to serve three-year terms of office on a staggered basis, with either one or two seats coming up for election each year as part of the November general election in a three-year cycle. At an annual reorganization meeting, the council selects one of its members to serves as mayor and another as deputy mayor.

, members of the Upper Pittsgrove Township Council are Mayor Edward J. Meschi (R, term on committee ends December 31, 2023; term as mayor ends 2022), Deputy Mayor David Zeck Sr. (R, term on committee ends 2023; term as deputy mayor ends 2022), Bruce W. Bishop (R, 2024), Jack R. Cimprich (R, 2024) and Michael J. Seery Sr. (R, 2022).

Federal, state and county representation 
Upper Pittsgrove Township is located in the 2nd Congressional District and is part of New Jersey's 3rd state legislative district.

 

Salem County is governed by a five-member Board of County Commissioners who are elected at-large to serve three-year terms of office on a staggered basis, with either one or two seats coming up for election each year. At an annual reorganization meeting held in the beginning of January, the board selects a Director and a Deputy Director from among its members. , Salem County's Commissioners (with party, residence and term-end year listed in parentheses) are 
Director Benjamin H. Laury (R, Elmer, term as commissioner ends December 31, 2024; term as director ends 2022), 
Deputy Director Gordon J. "Mickey" Ostrum, Jr. (R, Pilesgrove Township, term as commissioner ends 2024; term as deputy director ends 2022),  
R. Scott Griscom (R, Mannington Township, 2022), 
Edward A. Ramsay (R, Pittsgrove Township, 2023) and
Lee R. Ware (D, Elsinboro Township, 2022). Constitutional officers elected on a countywide basis are 
County Clerk Dale A. Cross (R, 2024),
Sheriff Charles M. Miller (R, 2024) and 
Surrogate Nicki A. Burke (D, 2023).

Politics
As of March 23, 2011, there were a total of 2,370 registered voters in Upper Pittsgrove Township, of which 447 (18.9% vs. 30.6% countywide) were registered as Democrats, 688 (29.0% vs. 21.0%) were registered as Republicans and 1,235 (52.1% vs. 48.4%) were registered as Unaffiliated. There were no voters registered to other parties. Among the township's 2010 Census population, 67.6% (vs. 64.6% in Salem County) were registered to vote, including 87.1% of those ages 18 and over (vs. 84.4% countywide).

In the 2012 presidential election, Republican Mitt Romney received 65.3% of the vote (1,102 cast), ahead of Democrat Barack Obama with 33.1% (558 votes), and other candidates with 1.6% (27 votes), among the 1,699 ballots cast by the township's 2,395 registered voters (12 ballots were spoiled), for a turnout of 70.9%. In the 2008 presidential election, Republican John McCain received 1,173 votes (64.8% vs. 46.6% countywide), ahead of Democrat Barack Obama with 595 votes (32.9% vs. 50.4%) and other candidates with 23 votes (1.3% vs. 1.6%), among the 1,810 ballots cast by the township's 2,449 registered voters, for a turnout of 73.9% (vs. 71.8% in Salem County). In the 2004 presidential election, Republican George W. Bush received 1,192 votes (64.4% vs. 52.5% countywide), ahead of Democrat John Kerry with 621 votes (33.6% vs. 45.9%) and other candidates with 29 votes (1.6% vs. 1.0%), among the 1,850 ballots cast by the township's 2,477 registered voters, for a turnout of 74.7% (vs. 71.0% in the whole county).

In the 2013 gubernatorial election, Republican Chris Christie received 76.9% of the vote (896 cast), ahead of Democrat Barbara Buono with 20.1% (234 votes), and other candidates with 3.0% (35 votes), among the 1,172 ballots cast by the township's 2,372 registered voters (7 ballots were spoiled), for a turnout of 49.4%. In the 2009 gubernatorial election, Republican Chris Christie received 814 votes (59.2% vs. 46.1% countywide), ahead of Democrat Jon Corzine with 372 votes (27.0% vs. 39.9%), Independent Chris Daggett with 138 votes (10.0% vs. 9.7%) and other candidates with 32 votes (2.3% vs. 2.0%), among the 1,376 ballots cast by the township's 2,441 registered voters, yielding a 56.4% turnout (vs. 47.3% in the county).

Education 
The Upper Pittsgrove School District serves public school students in pre-kindergarten through eighth grade at Upper Pittsgrove School. As of the 2020–21 school year, the district, comprised of one school, had an enrollment of 303 students and 33.3 classroom teachers (on an FTE basis), for a student–teacher ratio of 9.1:1.

Students in public school for ninth through twelfth grades attend Woodstown High School in Woodstown, which serves students from Pilesgrove Township and Woodstown, along with students Alloway Township, Oldmans Township and Upper Pittsgrove Township who attend the high school as part of sending/receiving relationships with the Woodstown-Pilesgrove Regional School District. As of the 2020–21 school year, the high school had an enrollment of 579 students and 49.7 classroom teachers (on an FTE basis), for a student–teacher ratio of 11.6:1.

Transportation

Roads and highways

County Route 553  (Buck Road) cuts across the eastern panhandle of the township, from Pittsgrove Township in the south to Franklin Township in the north.
 County Route 581 (Commissioners Pike) enters on the western border from Pilesgrove Township and heads north for  towards South Harrison Township.

Pole Tavern Circle is a traffic circle at the intersection of U.S. Route 40, State Route 77, Monroeville Road (County Route 604), and Daretown Road (County Route 635). The Pole Tavern Circle, named for a liberty pole that stood at the site during the American Revolutionary War, is the location of a large historic cannon that was first placed there in 1913.

Public transportation
NJ Transit provides service between Bridgeton and Philadelphia on the 410 route.

Winery
 Monroeville Vineyard & Winery

Notable people

People who were born in, residents of, or otherwise closely associated with Upper Pittsgrove include:
 Roscoe Lockwood (1875–1960), rower who competed in the 1900 Summer Olympics

References

External links

Upper Pittsgrove Township
Upper Pittsgrove School District

School Data for the Upper Pittsgrove School, National Center for Education Statistics
Woodstown High School

 
1846 establishments in New Jersey
Populated places established in 1846
Township form of New Jersey government
Townships in Salem County, New Jersey